"Cosmic Girl" is the second single from British funk and acid jazz band Jamiroquai's third studio album, Travelling Without Moving (1996). The song was released in the United Kingdom on 25 November 1996 via Sony Soho Square and in the United States in 1997 via Work Group. The song achieved great chart success, peaking at  6 on the UK Singles Chart. It also reached No. 3 in Italy, No. 4 in Iceland, and No. 10 in Finland. The B-side to the single is an instrumental, "Slipin' 'N' Slidin'", a song originating from another Jamiroquai track called "Mr Boogie", which was a live-only song. "Slipin 'N' Slidin'", just like "Mr Boogie", also has a vocal version.

Composition
"Cosmic Girl" is a disco song, based on rhythmic "looped beats" "to give it an off-centre, otherworldly" sound. The syncopated rhythm contains 10 pulses which occur inside a 32-beat pattern, with pulses on beats 4, 7, 10, 13, 16, 19, 22, 25, 27, and 30. Coincidentally, the first four beats of this pattern are the same as the George Gershwin song "I Got Rhythm". Jamiroquai's psychedelic lyric evokes a spacey environment, using terms such as "zero gravity", "hyperspace", "galaxy" and "quasar". A disco-era aura is achieved by incorporating early electronic synthesizers along with disco-style string parts also produced by synthesizers.

Performance
While the single, and especially its chart performance, received mixed reviews from critics, it has become one of the better-known tracks of the band, and a concert staple. Live versions usually last for 7–8 minutes, nearly double the duration of the album version. In 2006, it was reissued as part of the "Classic Club Mixes" series, which also included "Space Cowboy", "Deeper Underground", "Love Foolosophy" and "Alright". In 2019, it was remixed by French DJ Dimitri From Paris.

In the United Kingdom alone, the song has sold 250,580 copies as of March 2017, and is also their second-most-streamed track, with more than 78 million plays on Spotify and a further 66 million views on YouTube.

Critical reception
Justin Chadwick from Albumism wrote, "Replete with synth and string-blessed rhythms, the propulsive, disco-tinged "Cosmic Girl" finds Jay Kay serenading an irresistible, otherworldly woman akin to "some baby Barbarella”." Larry Flick from Billboard described it as "dreamy" and "more radio-friendly". He noted that here, Jamiroquai "craftily combines classic soul nuggets with the disco-soaked house music that has everyone gleefully twirling these days. The album version sparks with live instrumentation that breathes considerable depth into the chorus, while David Morales' remix has a more glossy tone that will sound awesome on a crowded club floor." Caroline Sullivan from The Guardian stated in her review of the album, that "Cosmic Girl", "which employs buoyant Earth, Wind and Fire-style harmonies, is fine".

Daisy & Havoc from Music Week'''s RM Dance Update praised the track, giving it five out of five. They added, ""Sends me into hyperspace when I see her pretty face..." – and it's not just the lyrics that are harping back to some of disco's more amusing space-age phases on this Jamiroquai single. The band's own mixes are totally groovy – combining some very funky sounds with some top disco strings and swirls and dusted lightly with the aforementioned silly but excellent vocals. With Morales mixes and the single mix still to come, this far north 'Cosmic Girl' is already a massive hit and bound to get bigger and bigger." Ted Kessler from NME called it a "bittersweet" gem, noting the singer's "fairy-lit disco" on the track. A reviewer from People Magazine declared it as a "mind-tripping rump-shaker", that "wrap up in all of four minutes and actually leave you wanting more."

Music video

The accompanying music video for the song was directed by Adrian Moat and was filmed at the Cabo de Gata, Spain. It depicts three famous supercars driving and racing each other through several highways and mountain roads across a desert landscape from clear daylight to dawn. The cars on the video are a black Ferrari F355 GTS, a purple Lamborghini Diablo SE30 and a red Ferrari F40. Jay Kay appears to be driving the purple Lamborghini with Stuart Zender on the co-pilot seat, but the driver of the black Ferrari is not shown in detail. It has four different edits: Versions 1–3, and the so-called 'Jay's cut' version.

In a Top Gear interview, Jay Kay said that, before filming, one car had been totalled during transportation, and the windscreen of the second was smashed after one of the so-called precision drivers knocked the camera off the cliff.

Jay stated, "They made three of those special-edition 30th-anniversary Diablos, and one was a Jota, so it was a 600 brake car that was not really road legal, so there were only two. So I had mine in storage, and the guy goes to stick it on the car transporter, and then I got word that he'd just totalled this car. There it is! [Points to picture on screen.] And we kind of had to have a purple one, because it was the purple—the cosmic—you know, it's just one of those things. So we got the other one, and I said: 'Look, wait until I get there. I'm flying in. Just nobody drive it until I get there, please. We can't afford to smash it.' So I came off the plane, and everybody looked really downtrodden, looking at the floor, and I went, 'Why are you looking so sad?, and they said, 'One of the precision drivers has knocked the camera off the cliff and taken out the front windscreen, so there's no windscreen. Lamborghini can't send one for another day or so.' So for most of the video, it had to be done with no windscreen; that's why you see me squinting, and actually trying to sing the song as well, while driving the mountain road". The F40 was provided by the Pink Floyd drummer Nick Mason, who drove in the video as well.

To celebrate 25 years since the release of Travelling Without Moving, the music video was remastered in HD for YouTube in 2021.

Track listings

 UK CD1 "Cosmic Girl" (radio edit) – 3:45
 "Slipin' 'N' Slidin'" – 3:36
 "Didjital Vibrations" – 5:47
 "Cosmic Girl" (classic radio mix) – 4:02

 UK CD2 "Cosmic Girl" – 4:03
 "Cosmic Girl" (Quasar mix) – 7:41
 "Cosmic Girl" (classic mix) – 9:22
 "Cosmic Girl" (Cosmic dub) – 6:47

 UK cassette single "Cosmic Girl" – 4:03
 "Slipin' 'N' Slidin'" – 3:36

 European CD single "Cosmic Girl" (radio edit) – 3:45
 "Slipin' 'N' Slidin'" – 3:36

 Australian CD and cassette single "Cosmic Girl" (radio edit) – 3:45
 "Cosmic Girl" (classic radio mix) – 4:02
 "Cosmic Girl" (Quasar mix) – 7:41
 "Cosmic Girl" (classic mix) – 9:22

 US maxi-CD single "Cosmic Girl" (album version) – 4:03
 "Cosmic Girl" (classic mix) – 9:22
 "Cosmic Girl" (Quasar mix) – 7:40
 "Cosmic Girl" (Cosmic dub) – 6:48
 "Cosmic Girl" (Quasar dub) – 7:17

 US 12-inch singleA1. "Cosmic Girl" (classic mix) – 9:22
A2. "Cosmic Girl" (Quasar mix) – 7:40
B1. "Cosmic Girl" (Cosmic dub) – 6:48
B2. "Cosmic Girl" (Quasar dub) – 7:17
B3. "Cosmic Girl" (album version) – 4:03

 Japanese CD single'''
 "Cosmic Girl" (radio edit)
 "Slipin' 'N' Slidin'"
 "Cosmic Girl" (classic radio mix)
 "Cosmic Girl" (classic mix)
 "Cosmic Girl" (Quasar mix)

Charts

Weekly charts

Year-end charts

Certifications

Release history

References

1996 singles
1996 songs
British disco songs
Jamiroquai songs
S2 Records singles
Songs about outer space
Songs written by Jason Kay